The Three Sisters is a small mountain range, or a mountain with three summits, within the northeastern Temescal Mountains, in Woodcrest within unincorporated Riverside County, California. the highest peak is nicknamed "Flat Top" because of the flattened top it has. There are many local rumors as to why the top of the hill was flattened. The locals walk, ride horses and ride motorcycles on flattop daily. Woodcrest's own 4 July fireworks takes place there annually.

The Three Sisters, is located east and north of Mockingbird Canyon, and south of Woodcrest.

References 

Mountains of Riverside County, California
Mountain ranges of Riverside County, California
Temescal Mountains
Mountains of Southern California
Mountain ranges of Southern California